Furylfuramide (also known as AF-2) is a synthetic nitrofuran derivative which was widely used as a food preservative in Japan since at least 1965, but withdrawn from the market in 1974 when it was observed to be mutagenic to bacteria in vitro and thus suspected of carcinogenicity. This was confirmed later when animal testing found it to cause benign and malignant tumors in the mammary glands, stomachs, esophagi, and lungs of rodents of both sexes, although insufficient evidence exists in human exposure.

This successful use of bacterial mutagenicity as a screen for carcinogenicity confirmed the use of this methodology as a rapid and efficient test, in comparison to animal testing alone, and led to its further development. The availability of such simpler tests in turn gave rise to greater government oversight and testing of compounds to which the public would be exposed.

References

Acrylamides
Carboxamides
Carcinogens
IARC Group 2B carcinogens
Nitrofurans
Toxicology
Suspected fetotoxicants
Male reproductive toxicants